Charles Ollivon (born 11 May 1993) is a French rugby union player. He plays mostly as a flanker for Toulon in the Top 14, although he can wear the number eight as well. He was the captain of the French national team from February 2020 to March 2021.

Club career
Ollivon started his rugby career in the Academy Bayonne side at the age of 16, before being promoted to the main side in 2012 at the age of 19. During the 2012–13 Top 14 season, Charles made his professional debut against Bordeaux Bègles on 30 March 2013, coming of the bench. He could have played in more matches that season, but a shoulder injury required him to have surgery in April 2013. The following season, he played in 9 matches, making his run on debut on 4 September 2013 in a 55–0 defeat to Clermont. However, in January 2014 he suffered from another injury which saw him miss most of the season. He returned to the team in late March, but was brought slowly into the team, making several appearances of the bench. During the 2014–15 Top 14 season, he started in almost every match of the season, putting in regular good performances at the back of the pack (Number 8).

International career
His strong ball carrying and break down work was recognized by French coach Philippe Saint-André, and therefore was named in his squad for the 2014 end-of-year rugby union internationals. He made his debut for France on 8 November 2014 against Fiji off the bench.

In January 2015 he was named in the France 31-man squad for the 2015 Six Nations Championship by coach Saint-André.

Ollivon made a comeback from a series of injuries in 2019, earning a spot in France's squad for the 2019 Rugby World Cup. He went on to start against Argentina and Tonga during the pool stages, also starting in the quarter-finals, against Wales. Ollivon scored a try against Wales, but France went on to lose 19-20 after a red card to Sebastien Vahaamahina.

Ollivon was announced as the new captain of the French men's national rugby team in January 2020 by coach Fabien Galthié, following the retirement of previous captain Guilhem Guirado. In his first game as captain, Charles scored 2 tries against England and led them to a 24-17 victory.

International tries

References

External links
Itsrugby profile
France profile at FFR
ESPN Profile

1993 births
Living people
French rugby union players
Rugby union flankers
Sportspeople from Pyrénées-Atlantiques
France international rugby union players
Aviron Bayonnais players
RC Toulonnais players
People from Labourd